Ayana Siriwardhana (born 8 April 1999) is a Sri Lankan cricketer. He made his Twenty20 debut for Moors Sports Club in the 2018–19 SLC Twenty20 Tournament on 15 February 2019. He made his List A debut for Moors Sports Club in the 2018–19 Premier Limited Overs Tournament on 4 March 2019. In November 2021, he was selected to play for the Kandy Warriors following the players' draft for the 2021 Lanka Premier League.

References

External links
 

1999 births
Living people
Sri Lankan cricketers
Moors Sports Club cricketers
Place of birth missing (living people)